Brainfeeder is an independent record label based in Los Angeles, California, founded by Flying Lotus in 2008, focusing on electronic music and instrumental hip hop. It has signed artists such as Ras G, Samiyam, The Gaslamp Killer, Thundercat, The Underachievers, Lapalux, Daedelus, and Mr. Oizo.

History
In 2007, Brainfeeder debuted as the name of a four-hour radio broadcast by Flying Lotus and his friends on Dublab. It is also the name of the first track on Flying Lotus's album Los Angeles. In 2008, Brainfeeder officially launched as a record label. In 2010, Ninja Tune offered Brainfeeder a deal to manufacture, distribute and promote the catalogue worldwide, with Alpha Pup Records remaining as the U.S. digital distributor. In that year, Brainfeeder was listed by LA Weekly as the most exciting Los Angeles indie label. In 2012, it was named "Label of the Year" at Gilles Peterson's Worldwide Awards.

Roster

 Austin Peralta 
 Captain Murphy 
 Daedelus
 DJ Paypal
 Dorian Concept
 Flying Lotus
 Genevieve Artadi
 George Clinton
 Georgia Anne Muldrow
 Hiatus Kaiyote
 Iglooghost
 Jaga Jazzist
 Jameszoo
 Jeremiah Jae
 Kamasi Washington
 Kuedo
 Lapalux
 Little Snake
 Locust Toybox
 Lorn
 Louis Cole
 Martyn
 Matthewdavid
 Miguel Atwood-Ferguson
 Mono/Poly
 Mr. Oizo
 Ras G
 Ross from Friends
 Ryat
 Salami Rose Joe Louis
 Samiyam
 Taylor McFerrin
 Teebs
 Terence Etc.
 The Gaslamp Killer
 Thundercat
 Tokimonsta
 The Underachievers
 Wajatta

Brainfeeder Films
In July 2016, Flying Lotus announced that a new film division was in work, and Brainfeeder Films was founded as a film finance and production company with Eddie Alcazar that September.

Notes

References

External links
 
 

American record labels
Music of Los Angeles
Electronic music record labels
Hip hop record labels
Record labels established in 2008
Ninja Tune
Flying Lotus